Lukas Birk (born 1982) is an Austrian photographer, archivist, and publisher. He is known for a visual archive work in Myanmar and research on Box Camera photography in Afghanistan. Birk has worked on photographic projects, films and visual research in China, South and South-East Asia and the Indian subcontinent. He has published numerous books on visual culture and photographic history.

He co-founded the Austro Sino Art Program (2008–2014) in Beijing, China and the SewonArtSpace in Yogyakarta, Indonesia. He founded the Myanmar Photo Archive, Myanmar’s first public photography archive and set up an accompanying publishing program. His publishing company Fraglich Publishing focuses on visual culture publications and limited edition prints.

About 
Lukas Birk was born in 1982 in Bregenz, Vorarlberg, Austria. Initially he studied journalism and radio. Birk attended at University of West London in the Ealing School of Art Design and Media, graduating with a bachelor's degree in digital art and photography in 2005. He continuing his studies at Rhode Island School of Design (RISD), graduating with a M.F.A. degree in Printmaking in 2017. Birk's work is held in the public permanent collections at Federal Collection Austria, and Regional Collection Vorarlberg, Austria.

Work

Kafkanistan 
Birk’s first major body of work Kafkanistan – tourism to conflict areas (2005–2008), with Irish ethnographer Sean Foley, explores the activities of tourists in Afghanistan and the Pakistani tribal areas. The research resulted in a feature film, exhibition and book.

Austro Sino Arts program 
Birk studied Digital art and Photography at the University of West London and after completing his Bachelor’s degree in 2005, he moved to Beijing.

Alongside Austrian artists and professor Karel Dudesek, Birk co-founded the Austro Sino Arts Program (ASAP). ASAP operated out of Beijing between 2008 and 2014, organizing exhibitions, film festivals and publications. The program showcased the work of non-Chinese artists who worked in China and produced artists’ perspectives on China. The project received major support from the Austrian Arts Council.

During his years in China, Birk founded a commercial photography studio, taught photography and exhibited his artworks widely. He also produced a series and monograph titled Polaroids from the Middle Kingdom.

SewonArtSpace 
In 2011, Karel Dudesek and Birk founded SewonArtSpace in Yogyakarta, Indonesia. SewonArtSpace is a non-profit art space and residency program hosting primarily Austrian artists and connecting them to the local art scene in Yogyakarta, one of South East Asia’s most thriving art cities. The project received funding from the Austrian Chancellery office.

Afghan Box Camera project 
In 2011, Birk returned with his colleague Sean Foley to Afghanistan to investigate the last remaining Box Camera photographers working on the streets of Kabul and other cities in Afghanistan and Peshawar, Pakistan. They conducted research trips between 2011 and 2014 resulting in an online archive, the book Afghan Box Camera (Dewi Lewis, UK, 2013) and the book Photo Peshawar (Mapin, India, 2017). Birk and Foley coined the terms Afghan Box Camera and Kamra-e-Faoree, two descriptions for Box Camera photography. This was primarily through the widespread media coverage, open-source films and ‘how to build an Afghan Box Camera’ manual published on social media and on their own platform.

Myanmar photo archive 
Birk started collecting photographic material and conducting research on photographic history in Myanmar in 2013. Since then, he has founded the first public photographic archive focusing on local Myanmar Visual History, the Myanmar Photo Archive (MPA). MPA is organizing exhibitions with the materials in the archive – currently comprising 20,000 images – and has started a photo book publishing program in Yangon. The books are published in English and Burmese and distributed internationally. The archive has received major funding from the British Library, the Goethe Institute Myanmar and the European Union in Myanmar.

Publications and monographs 

 Kafkanistan – tourism to conflict zones Lukas Birk and Sean Foley. Fraglich Publishing, Austria /Glitterati Inc., USA, 2008/2012. 
 Afghan Box Camera Lukas Birk and Sean Foley. Dewi Lewis Publishing, United Kingdom, 2013. 
 Polaroids from the Middle Kingdom Lukas Birk. Glitterati Inc., USA, 2014. 
 35 Bilder Krieg Lukas Birk. Fraglich Publishing, Austria, 2015. 
 Photo Peshawar Sean Foley and Lukas Birk. Maping/Pix Publishing, India, 2015. 
 Burmese Photographers Lukas Birk. Goethe Institut Myanmar 2018
 Gülistan Lukas Birk and Natasha Christia. Fraglich Publishing, Austria, 2019
 FERNWEH – a man's journey Lukas Birk. Fraglich Publishing, Austria, 2019. ·

Editorial work 
Austro Sino Arts Program and SewonArtSpace

 MiFan米饭, Austro Sino Arts Program, Beijing, 2009 
 DaBao带走, Austro Sino Arts Program, Beijing, 2010 
 ChuenMen泉门, Austro Sino Arts Program, Beijing, 2011 
 DaZiBao大字报, Austro Sino Arts Program, Beijing, 2012 
 Left/right 左/ 右 , Austro Sino Arts Program, Beijing, 2013 
 The Gallop of the Courser 骏马飞驰, Austro Sino Arts Program, Beijing, 2013 
 Refuse the shadows of the past; 5 years Austrian Art Made in China. Austro Sino Arts Program, Beijing, 2013 
 To Know The Unknown, SewonArtSpace, Indonesia, 2015 

Myanmar Photo Archive / Fraglich Publishing

 ONE YEAR IN YANGON 1978. Myanmar Photo Archive, Yangon, 2017 
 U Than Maung, the No 1 Amateur Photographer, Myanmar Photo Archive, Yangon, 2018 
 REPRODUCED, rethinking P.A. KLier & D.A. Ahuja, Myanmar Photo Archive, Yangon, 2018 
 My Universe by BayBay, Myanmar Photo Archive, Yangon, 2019 
 Irene – A Burmese Icon, Myanmar Photo Archive, Yangon, 2020 
 Yangon Fashion 1979 – Fashion=Resistance, Myanmar Photo Archive, 2020

References

External links 
 Lukas Birk official website

1982 births
Living people
Austrian photographers
Austrian archivists
Austrian publishers (people)
Rhode Island School of Design alumni